The initials WLP may stand for several things, such as the following:

Wafer-level packaging, a type of integrated circuit (microchip) packaging
Weakest liberal precondition, a computer programming concept
WebSphere Liberty Profile, a computer software version
Windows Logo Program, a Microsoft Windows branding and certification program
Women's Learning Partnership for Rights, Development, and Peace, an international non-profit, non-governmental organization that is dedicated to women's leadership and empowerment.
Wikileaks Party, an Australian political party
World Library Publications, A former major publisher of Catholic liturgical music in the United States, now a division of GIA Publications